Ribare may refer to:

 Ribare (Kruševac), a village in Serbia
 Ribare (Žagubica), a village in Serbia
 Ribare (Jagodina), a village in Serbia
 Ribare (Svrljig), a village in Serbia